USS Rosa (SP-757) was a United States Navy patrol vessel in commission from 1917 to 1918.

Rosa was built as a private wooden motorboat of the same name in 1909 by Jensen at San Diego, California. In 1917, the U.S. Navy acquired her from her owner, Jack Merrill of Coronado, California, for use as a section patrol boat during World War I. She was commissioned on 17 May 1917 as USS Rosa (SP-757), although the Navy did not actually take delivery of her from Merrill until 29 June 1917, when she entered service.

Assigned to duty in San Diego Harbor, Rosa conducted patrols, provided minor transportation services, and conducted salvage operations for the rest of World War I. Ca.

Rosa was decommissioned around 17 December 1918 and was returned to Merrill on 6 January 1919.

Notes

References
 for USS Rosa (SP-757)
 for USS Nomad (SP-756)
SP-757 Rosa at Department of the Navy Naval History and Heritage Command Online Library of Selected Images: U.S. Navy Ships -- Listed by Hull Number "SP" #s and "ID" #s -- World War I Era Patrol Vessels and other Acquired Ships and Craft numbered from SP-700 through SP-799
NavSource Online: Section Patrol Craft Photo Archive Rosa (SP 757)

Patrol vessels of the United States Navy
World War I patrol vessels of the United States
Ships built in San Diego
1909 ships